Countess de Galvaez (or Countess de Galvez, or Countess of Galvez) was launched in 1780 in America, and lengthened and rebuilt in 1785, when she assumed British registry. She then traded with Mobile, New Orleans, Pensacola, or more simply the "Mississippi". From 1791 on she made one voyage as a whaler and one as a slave ship. There is some confusion about her ownership in the period 1791-1794. She was lost in 1794 on her return to England from her slave-trading voyage.

Career
Countess de Galvaez first appeared in Lloyd's Register in 1786 (Lloyd's Register was not published in 1785), with W. Reed, master, J. Mather, owner, and trade London–Pensacola. However, Lloyd's List shows Countess de Galvez, Reid, master, sailing from Gravesend on 10 April 1785, bound for Pensacola.

On 18 May 1788, Captain Redmayne of Minerva was sailing from Jamaica to Liverpool when she encountered Countess of Galvez, Reed, master. Countess was 12 days out of New Orleans and the day before had grounded on grounded on Mantanza Reef in nine feet of water. Reed had about 100 bales of hides thrown overboard and that lightened Countess enough that she was able to get over the reef. He reported that she had lost a great part of her sheathing but had started no leaks. On 4 June Countess, Reed, master, broke her journey from New Orleans to London by putting into New York for repairs. She was expected to resume her voyage later that month.

Whaling voyage
On 18 August 1791 Captain Henry Delano sailed Countess de Galvaez for the Pacific Ocean. (Earlier, Delano had been master of the whaler .) Countess arrived at Falmouth, from Peru, in November 1792.

There is some ambiguity about the ownership of Countess de Galvaez during her whaling voyage. The database of whaling voyages gives the owner as Daniel Bennett, but Lloyd's Register (see below) gives it as Mason & Co. Furthermore, one source states that Bennett only owned Countess in 1794, for one year.

Slave trading voyage
Captain James Hoskins sailed Countess from London on 5 January 1794, bound for West Africa. Her owner was Daniel Bennett.

She commenced gathering her slaves on 30 March, first at Cape Coast Castle and then at Anomabu. She left Africa on 21 April, and arrived at Jamaica on 5 June, where she landed 330 slaves. It is not clear when she left Jamaica.

Lloyd's Register

Loss
Countess of Galvez was driven ashore and wrecked at Shoeburyness, Essex, on or immediately before 10 October 1794. At the time she was returning to London from Jamaica. She was no longer listed in Lloyd's Register in 1795.

A second Countess of Galvez
Lloyd's List reported on 14 April 1795 that Countess of Galvez, Yarra, master, had arrived at Cadiz from Petersburg. Then on 6 January 1797, Lloyd's List reported that she had arrived at Plymouth. She had been sailing from Montevideo to Cadiz when the British transport Esther, returning to England from Gibraltar, had encountered and captured her. Her trade and capture suggest that this Countess was a Spanish ship.

Notes, citations, and references
Notes

Citations

References
Stanbury, Myra, Kandy-Jane Henderson, Bernard Derrien, Nicolas Bigourdan, & Evelyne Le Touze (2015) "Chapter 18: Epilogue" [online]. In: Stanbury, Myra. The Mermaid Atoll Shipwreck: A Mysterious Early 19th-century Loss. (Fremantle, WA: Australian National Centre of Excellence for Maritime Archaeology and the Australasian Institute for Maritime Archaeology): 235-290.   [cited 20 Aug 18].

1780 ships
Age of Sail merchant ships of England
Whaling ships
London slave ships
Maritime incidents in 1794